The field of fire is the area around a weapon or weapons that can be reached by bullets, shells, arrows, or other projectiles.

Field(s) of Fire may also refer to:

Art, entertainment, and media

Games
 Field of Fire (video game), 1984 video game for the Atari 8-bit family
 Fields of Fire (game), 2009 card/campaign historical simulation game
 War Along the Mohawk (also known as Fields of Fire: War Along the Mohawk), 1998 strategy video game
Field of Fire, fictional first-person shooter in the internet web series Video Game High School

Literature
 Fields of Fire (novel), 1978 novel by James Webb

Music
Albums
 Field of Fire (album), album by Richard Lloyd
 Fields of Fire (album), 1986 album by Corey Hart

Songs
 "Fields of Fire" (song), 1983 song by Big Country

Television
Series
 Fields of Fire (TV series), an Australian television series

Episodes
 "Field of Fire" (Star Trek: Deep Space Nine), a seventh-season episode of Star Trek: Deep Space Nine